The Crash Cruiserweight Championship is a professional wrestling championship contested for in the Mexican lucha libre promotion The Crash Lucha Libre based in Tijuana, Baja California. Traditionally most lucha libre promotions promote a division labelled as the "Junior Heavyweight" division, while "Cruiserweight" is a term more used in the United States or Canada but The Crash uses the term "Cruiserweight". As it was a professional wrestling championship, the championship was not won not by actual competition, but by a scripted ending to a match determined by the bookers and match makers. On occasion the promotion declares a championship vacant, which means there is no champion at that point in time. This can either be due to a storyline, or real life issues such as a champion suffering an injury being unable to defend the championship, or leaving the company.

From its creation in 2013 until the introduction of The Crash Heavyweight Championship in late 2017, the cruiserweight championship was the highest profile singles championship in the promotion. The current champion is Dinámico, who won the championship on November 5, 2021, when he defeated then-champion Oraculo in a match that also included Black Danger. Fénix was the first champion, having won a multi-man match on June 14, 2013, to become the inaugural champion, Oraculo is the only wrestler to have won the championship twice. Ángel Metálico's championship run from February 1, 2014 to May 8, 2015  is the longest in the history of the championship, while Rey Horus' 65 day reign is the shortest. The championship has been declared vacant twice, first when then-champion Bestia 666 was unable to defend the championship in 2016, and again in early 2018 when Fénix vacated the championship as he moved into the heavyweight division.

Title history

Combined reigns

Footnotes

References

External links
 The Crash Cruiserweight Championship

Cruiserweight wrestling championships
The Crash Lucha Libre championships